Edith P. Foulke Stanton (1875–1962) was a teacher, writer at newspapers and magazines, and an author of books. She lived in Ormond Beach, Florida and is listed as a Great Floridian. Her son shared her interest in history.

Bibliography
 “Ruins of Early Plantations” by Edith P. Stanton, Ormond Beach, Flagler Library Collection.
 A History of the Ormond Union Church: Ormond Beach Florida 1943 - Ormond Beach (Fla.)
 Early Plantations of the Halifax: Concerning the Ruins 1949 Ormond Village Improvement Association 1949

References

1875 births
1962 deaths
American non-fiction writers
People from Ormond Beach, Florida
American women non-fiction writers